Jason Goode (born September 13, 1986) is an American football wide receiver who is currently a free agent. Goode has previously spent time with the Washington Redskins and the Carolina Panthers of the National Football League. He played college football at Maryland. On August 16, 2008 in a pre-season matchup with the New York Jets he scored the winning touchdown that gave the Redskins a 13-10 win and a 3-0 pre-season record.

College career
Goode spent his time at Maryland behind Joey Haynos and Dan Gronkowski on the depth chart.

Professional career

Washington Redskins
Goode signed with the Washington Redskins in 2008 after unselected in the 2008 NFL Draft. He was released on August 26, 2008.

Maryland Maniacs
Goode signed with the Maryland Maniacs of the Indoor Football League in February 2009.

Carolina Panthers
The Maryland Maniacs released Goode on March 17, 2009 so he could sign with the Carolina Panthers.

References

External links
Maryland Terrapins bio

1986 births
Living people
Players of American football from Baltimore
American football tight ends
Maryland Terrapins football players
Washington Redskins players
Johnstown Generals players
Baltimore Mariners players